Monsignor Stanislas Marie Georges Jude Lalanne (born 3 August 1948 in Metz) is a French Roman Catholic bishop.

From 2007 to 2013 he was Bishop of Coutances-et-Avranches. On 31 January 2013 he was appointed Bishop of Pontoise.

See also
 Catholic Church in France
 List of the Roman Catholic dioceses of France

References

Sources
 Catholic Hierarchy: Stanislas Lalanne 

1948 births
Living people
Bishops of Pontoise
Bishops of Coutances
Clergy from Metz
21st-century Roman Catholic bishops in France